Mets Sepasar is a village in the Ashotsk Municipality of the Shirak Province of Armenia.

Etymology 
The village was previously known as Shishtapa mets, Shishtapa I, and Shishtapa-hay.

Demographics
The population of the village since 1831 is as follows:

References 

Populated places in Shirak Province